Máté Halász (born 2 June 1984, in Kecskemét) is a Hungarian handballer who plays for Gyöngyösi KK and the Hungarian national team.

Achievements
Nemzeti Bajnokság I:
Runner-up: 2003, 2004, 2005
Magyar Kupa:
Runner-up: 2003, 2004, 2005

References

External links
 Máté Halász career statistics at Worldhandball

1984 births
Living people
People from Kecskemét
Hungarian male handball players
Sportspeople from Bács-Kiskun County